Fissurina nigrolabiata is a species of lichen in the family Graphidaceae. Found in the Philippines, it was described as new to science in 2011.

References

Lichens described in 2011
Lichen species
Lichens of Malesia
Ostropales
Taxa named by Robert Lücking